Daylam Meddah (born 6 October 2002) is a French professional footballer who plays as a centre-back for Sochaux.

Career
Meddah is a youth product of the academies of ES du Mont-Gaillard and Le Havre. On 20 July 2019, he signed his first professional contract with Le Havre, signing a 3-year contract. He began his career with the reserves of Le Havre. He briefly joined the reserves of Angers on 18 August 2021. He transferred to Sochaux on 16 June 2022, signing a 3-year contract. He made his professional debut with Sochaux in a 0– Ligue 2 tie with Paris FC on 1 August 2022, coming on in the 70th minute.

Personal life
Born in France, Meddah is of Moroccan and Algerian descent.

References

External links
 

2002 births
Living people
People from Montivilliers
French footballers
French sportspeople of Moroccan descent
French sportspeople of Algerian descent
Le Havre AC players
Angers SCO players
FC Sochaux-Montbéliard players
Ligue 2 players
Championnat National 2 players
Championnat National 3 players
Association football midfielders